Mark David Miller (August 6, 1891 – May 8, 1970) was an American photographer.

Mark was born in Scranton, Kansas, the son of Amos B. Miller and Mary Martindale Miller.  In 1905 his family moved to the Fort Collins, Colorado area, possibly to alleviate his mother’s asthmatic condition.

In 1911 Miller apprenticed himself as a photographer to Claude Patrick.  In 1912 he opened his own photographic business in Longmont, Colorado, 40 miles southwest of Fort Collins.  In 1914 Miller bought Patrick’s studio in Fort Collins and subsequently moved there, first living upstairs from the studio and then moving to a nearby house.

Between 1910 and Miller’s death in 1970 it is estimated he took over 70,000 pictures of Fort Collins landmarks, portraits of local citizens, and local scenery such as the Poudre Canyon near Fort Collins. Miller’s photography is represented in the book Fort Collins: The Miller Photographs by Barbara Fleming and Malcolm McNeill.

Miller died on May 8, 1970 and is buried in Grandview Cemetery, Fort Collins in Fort Collins.

The bulk of Mark Miller's photographs were donated after his death to the Fort Collins Local History Archive located at the Fort Collins Museum.

Notes

Sources
 Fleming, B. and McNeill, M., Fort Collins: The Miller Photographs. Charleston, SC: Arcadia Publishing, 2009. , .

External links
 Fort Collins: The Miller Photographs at Google Books
 Fort Collins Local History Archive

1891 births
1970 deaths
20th-century American photographers
People from Osage County, Kansas
People from Fort Collins, Colorado